Desulfacinum hydrothermale is a thermophilic sulfate-reducing bacterium. Its cells are oval-shaped, 0.8–1 μm in width and 1.5–2.5 μm in length, motile and Gram-negative. The type strain is MT-96T (=DSM 13146).

References

Further reading
Barton, Larry L., and W. Allan Hamilton, eds. Sulphate-reducing bacteria: Environmental and engineered systems. Cambridge University Press, 2007.
Vos, P., et al. "Bergey’s Manual of Systematic Bacteriology, Volume 3: The Firmicutes." (2009).

External links

LPSN
WORMS
Type strain of Desulfacinum hydrothermale at BacDive -  the Bacterial Diversity Metadatabase

Thermodesulfobacteriota
Bacteria described in 2000